Al Romano (born April 14, 1953) is a former gridiron football defensive tackle who played two seasons in the Canadian Football League (CFL) with the Hamilton Tiger-Cats and Toronto Argonauts. He was drafted by the Houston Oilers in the eleventh round of the 1977 NFL Draft. Romano played college football at the University of Pittsburgh and attended Solvay High School in Solvay, New York. He was a consensus All-American in 1976.

References

External links
Just Sports Stats

Living people
1954 births
Players of American football from New York (state)
American football defensive tackles
Canadian football defensive linemen
American players of Canadian football
Pittsburgh Panthers football players
Hamilton Tiger-Cats players
Toronto Argonauts players
All-American college football players
Sportspeople from Schenectady, New York
People from Solvay, New York